The Würschnitz is a river of Saxony, Germany. At its confluence with the Zwönitz in the southern suburbs of Chemnitz, the river Chemnitz is formed.

See also
List of rivers of Saxony

Rivers of Saxony
Rivers of Germany